Godhra is one of the 182 Legislative Assembly constituencies of Gujarat state in India. It is part of Panchmahal district and a part of Panchmahal Loksabha seat.

List of segments
This assembly seat represents the following segments,

 Godhra Taluka (Part) Villages – Sampa, Bakhkhar, Tarvadi, Chhavad, Pipaliya, Bodidra Bujarg, Dholi, Vansiya, Khajuri Sampa, Mor Dungara, Nasirpur, Chhabanpur, Samli, Padhiyar, Vinzol, Daruniya, Dhanol( Jangle), Govindi, Kanku Thambhla, Chanchopa, Kanajiya, Orwada, Kevadiya, Chanchelav, Erandi, Kotda, Jafrabad, Bhamaiya, Pandva, Betiya, Vavadi Khurd, Veganpur, Tuwa, Gusar, Goli, Bhima, Gavasi, Harkundi, Ambali, Vavadi Bujarg, Paravdi, Chundadi, Gadh, Ladpur, Vadelav, Sankali, Angaliya, Bamroli Khurd, Gadukpur, Dayal, Lilesara, Chikhodra, Hamirpur, Rupanpura, Nani Kantadi, Raisingpura, Ranipura, Chanchpur, Ratanpur (Reliya), Kalyana, Asardi, Bhalodiya, Reliya, Ankadiya, Veraiya, Vatlav, Tarboradi, Pratappura, Rampura (Jodka), Dhanol, Isrodiya, Mahelol, Bhanpura, Karanpura, Popatpura, Vanakpur, Mahuliya, Chhariya, Kaliya Kuwa, Rinchhiya, Tajpur, Thana Garjan, Sarangpur, Jitpura, Bhalaniya, Bhatpura, Torna, Ladupura, Achhala, Godhra (M).

Member of Legislative Assembly

Election results

2022

2017

2012

See also
 List of constituencies of Gujarat Legislative Assembly
 Panchmahal district
 Gujarat Legislative Assembly

References

Assembly constituencies of Gujarat
Panchmahal district